Olympic or Olympics may refer to

Sports

Competitions
 Olympic Games, international multi-sport event held since 1896
 Summer Olympic Games
 Winter Olympic Games
 Ancient Olympic Games, ancient multi-sport event held in Olympia, Greece between 776 BC and 393 AD
 Wenlock Olympian Games, a forerunner of the modern Olympic Games, held since 1850
 Olympic (greyhounds), a competition held annually at Brighton & Hove Greyhound Stadium

Clubs and teams
 Adelaide Olympic FC, a soccer club from Adelaide, South Australia
 Fribourg Olympic, a professional basketball club based in Fribourg, Switzerland
 Sydney Olympic FC, an Australian soccer club
 Olympic Club (Barbacena), a Brazilian football club based in Barbacena, Minas Gerais state
 Olympic Mvolyé, a Cameroonian football club based in Mvolyé
 Olympic Club (Egypt), a football and sports club based in Alexandria
 Blackburn Olympic F.C., an English football club based in Blackburn, Lancashire
 Rushall Olympic F.C., an English football club based in Rushall
 FC Olympic Tallinn, an Estonian football club
 Olympic Azzaweya SC, a Libyan football club based in Zawiya
 Wellington Olympic AFC, a semi-professional association football (soccer) club in Wellington, New Zealand
 Olympic FC de Niamey, a football club based in Niamey, Niger
 BK Olympic, a Swedish football club located in Lindängen
 Olympic Club, an athletic and private social club in San Francisco, California
 Boston Olympics, a defunct farm team for the Boston Bruins from 1940 to 1952
 Detroit Olympics, a minor league hockey team in Detroit, Michigan, from 1927 to 1936
 McKeesport Olympics, a professional football team from McKeesport, Pennsylvania, from 1896 until around 1940
 Washington Olympics, an early professional baseball club in Washington, DC
 FK Olimpic Sarajevo, a football club based in Sarajevo, Bosnia and Herzegovina

Other
 Olympic Stadium, name usually given to the centrepiece stadium of the Summer Olympic Games
 Olympic Conference (disambiguation), three American high school conferences

Military
USS Olympic (SP-260), a United States Navy patrol vessel in commission from 1917 to 1919
 Operation Olympic, a component of Operation Downfall, the World War II Allied planned invasion of Japan

Places
 Tai Kok Tsui, a district in Hong Kong, informally called Olympic
 Olympic Peninsula, a large arm of land in western Washington state, United States
 Olympic Mountains, on the Olympic Peninsula
 Olympic National Park, on the Olympic Peninsula
 Olympic (constituency), a constituency of Yau Tsim Mong District, Hong Kong
 Olympic, a commune in Chamkar Mon District, Phnom Penh, Cambodia

Transportation 
 Olympic Air, a Greek airline based in Athens, successor to Olympic Airlines
 Olympic Airlines, former state run airline of Greece that operated under the name Olympic Airways until 2009
 Olympic-class ocean liner, three ocean liners built for the White Star Line
 RMS Olympic, sister ship of the RMS Titanic and HMHS Britannic
 Olympic (unfinished ship), sister ship of RMS Oceanic
 Olympic, a cruise ship built in 1950
 Olympic-class ferry, ferries under construction for the Washington State Ferries fleet
 Olympic station, a rapid transit station in Hong Kong
 Olímpica metro station, a rapid transit station in Mexico City
 Olimpiiska, a metro station in Kyiv
 Olympic Highway, New South Wales, Australia
 Olympic Boulevard (Melbourne), Victoria, Australia
 Olympic Boulevard (Los Angeles), California, United States

Arts and entertainment
 Olympic Studios, an independent commercial recording studio in South West London
 Olympic (band), a Czech band founded in 1962
 The Olympics (band), a U.S. doo-wop band from the 1950s
 Olympic Theatre, a London theatre from 1806 to 1899
 "Olympic", a 1990 song from the album ex:el by 808 State
 "Olympic", a 2010 song from the album Metallic Spheres by The Orb
 "Olympics", the twelfth episode of the television series Superstore

Other uses
 Olympic (soil), a soil series found in Washington and Oregon, US
 Olympic College, Bremerton, Washington, United States
 Olympic High School (disambiguation), various US schools
 Olympic Paints & Stains, a brand belonging to PPG Industries

See also
 The Olympicks, an American production group
 Olympique (disambiguation)
 Cotswold Olimpick Games, sports event held in England since 1612